Leslie Craig (14 October 1904 – 3 October 1971) was a Scottish first-class cricketer and medical doctor.

Craig was born at Edinburgh in October 1904. He was educated at George Watson's College, before matriculating to study medicine at both the University of Edinburgh and the University of Glasgow. A club cricketer for Watsonians Cricket Club, he made two appearances for Scotland in first-class cricket against Ireland, in 1928 at Edinburgh and 1929 at Dublin. Playing as a wicket-keeper in the Scottish team, he took four catches and made a single stumping in his two matches, in addition to scoring 30 runs. As a medical practitioner, Craig spent 40 years in England as a general practitioner in Tyneside. He died in October 1971 at Willington Quay, Northumberland; he was unmarried and had no children.

References

External links
 

1904 births
1971 deaths
Cricketers from Edinburgh
People educated at George Watson's College
Alumni of the University of Edinburgh
Alumni of the University of Glasgow
Scottish cricketers
20th-century Scottish medical doctors